TVOkids (styled as tvokids) is the brand for most of the children's programming aired by TVO (formerly TVOntario) in Canada. It was launched on April 1, 1994, and runs from 6:00 a.m. to 7:00 p.m. daily. The brand also operates two 24-hour online live streams, one that features regular TVOkids programming (simulcast with broadcast television), and another dedicated to its original series PAW Patrol. These channels are targeted at ages from 2 to 11.

Hosts
Since its inception in 1994, TVOKids has had numerous hosts. In chronological order, the hosts of TVOKids were: Patty Sullivan, Kevin Brauch, Joseph Motiki, Rekha Shah, Gisèle Corinthios, Julie Zwillich, Phil McCordic, Julie Patterson, Nicole Stamp, Milton Barnes, Jackie English, Mark Sykes, Ryan Field, Kara Harun, Drew Dafoe, Dalmar Abuzeid, Cassius (Cass) Crieghtney, Melissa Peters, Daniel Fernandes, Mickeey Nguyen, Lucas Meeuse, Laura Commisso, Greg Liow, Monica Brighton, Matt Nethersole and Maryanne.
 

The current hosts are Monica Brighton, Matt Nethersole, Maryanne and Laura Commisso.

Programming Blocks

That TVO Kids Show
That TVO Kids Show launched on August 26, 2019. It was hosted by Laura and Lucas. It broadcasts live daily. During each episode, a different code is given to the audience then going to live stream via webcam or phone for the day's topics or feature showcase. 

That TVO Kids Show ended on April 8, 2022, replaced with reruns of various shows from TVO's library.

In October 2022, It Replaced by TikTok's KnowBrainers instead of the That TVOKids Show.

School Age
School Age (formerly known as The Crawlspace and The Space) is the name of the afterschool programming block. It airs nonstop episodes of various series with a host block between each episode. The Crawlspace launched on April 4, 1994, and was originally hosted by Patty Sullivan and Kevin Brauch. School Age airs daily. It was hosted by Matt Nethersole, Laura Commisso, and Monica Brighton.

Preschool
TVOKids' preschool block, (formerly The Nook and Gisèle's Big Backyard), airs weekdays. It includes interstitial segments hosted by Gisèle Corinthios and several puppets, including Sticks the Squirrel (Jason Hopley), Jay the Blue Jay (Ali Eisner), Melvin the Skunk (Marty Stelnick), This (Ryan Field), That (Frank Meschkuleit), and Polkaroo. Polkaroo's trio of "Polka Dot Door Friends" Dumpty, Humpty, and Marigold also appear in smaller-than-human doll size rather than larger-than-human suits. This is their first re-appearance since Polka Dot Shorts ended in 2001.

TVO ended production of new Gisele's Big Backyard segments in May 2016.

Logo

Programming

References

External links
 

TVO original programming
Television programming blocks in Canada
preschool education television networks
1994 establishments in Ontario